The Venerable William Brice Ady  (1816–1882)  was Archdeacon of Colchester from 1864 until his death.

Ady was born in Devonport, Devon, educated at Exeter College, Oxford and was the Rector at Little Baddow from 1857.

References

Late modern

 

1816 births
People from Devonport, Plymouth
Alumni of Exeter College, Oxford
Archdeacons of Colchester
1882 deaths